Fort Royal (or Fort Royale) may refer to:

 Fort-de-France, the capital of Martinique
 Fort Saint Louis (Martinique), a fortification at Fort-de-France
 Fort Royal (Newfoundland), a fortification in Canada
 Fort-Liberté, a fortification in Haiti
 Fort Frederiksborg, a fort in Ghana
 St. George's, Grenada, capital of Grenada (former name)

See also
 Fort Royal Hill, a park (and former fort) in England